Frontier Gambler is a 1956 American Western film directed by Sam Newfield and written by Orville H. Hampton. The film stars John Bromfield, Coleen Gray, Kent Taylor, Jim Davis, Margia Dean and Veda Ann Borg. The film was released on July 1, 1956, by Associated Film Releasing Corporation.

Plot

Cast          
John Bromfield as Deputy Curt Darrow
Coleen Gray as Sylvia 'The Princess' Melbourne
Kent Taylor as Roger 'The Duke' Chadwick
Jim Davis as Tony Burton
Margia Dean as Gloria Starling
Veda Ann Borg as Francie Merritt
Stanley Andrews as Philo Dewey
Nadine Ashdown as Sylvia
Tracey Roberts as Helen McBride
Roy Engel as Tom McBride
John Merton as Shorty
Frank Sully as Bartender

References

External links
 

1956 films
1950s English-language films
American Western (genre) films
1956 Western (genre) films
Films directed by Sam Newfield
1950s American films
American black-and-white films